Historia Normannis is a 12th-century reenactment society, primarily based in the UK. It currently has around ~40 active 'cells' across the UK, and a cell group in Brittany, France. The society has an active membership of around 600, making it one of the largest societies in the UK. The group's primary focus is on the period 1135–1215. The society usually hosts a large event in the first weekend in May.

Activities
The society, like most in the UK, provides a range of combat displays and living history craft displays, as well as engaging in film-work and other promotional activities – often featuring in local press in locations where the group is highly active. They recently featured in Episode 4 of the UKTV series, Weekend Warriors, which followed the group's build-up to their annual event at Whittington Castle in Shropshire.

Membership
The society accepts new members through any of the currently active cell groups in the UK and France. Details about joining can be found on the group's website.

References

External links
Official Society Webpage

Historical reenactment groups
Medieval reenactment